Area code 618 serves the municipality of Durango in the State of Durango. The area code was created in 2002 as a result of the consolidation of location specific area codes 181, 182, and 183. The consolidation, mandated by the Plan Nacional de Numeracion (PNN), assigned area codes based on geography, and took place during the process of phone numbering restructure in Mexico. The process objective was to alleviate saturation of existing area codes, and consisted of progressively transferring numbers from the area code to the local number. The local area code went from 181 to 18 and lastly to 1, while at the same time the local number length increased from 5 to 7 digits.

In the process, local area codes went from designating a city or town to designating a geographical area. The new 618 area code is centered in Victoria de Durango; the original code for the city of Victoria de Durango was 1812. A total of 3,078,901 numbers have been assigned to this area code as of November 2018.

Municipalities in the area code: 1

Cities and Towns in the area code: 22

Companies providing phone service in the area code: 28

Local Number: 7 Digits; International dialing: +52 + 618 + 7 digits

References

618
Durango